Idhaya Thamarai is a 1990 Indian Tamil-language romantic drama film directed by K. Rajeshwar, starring Karthik and Revathi. It was released on 14 January 1990.

Plot 

Vijay is an impulsive angry youth who falls in love with Manju. After an incident, he is arrested and a few years later, he meets Manju who is now married. She is married to her company owner Ranjith in order to be saved from Vijay's enemies.

Cast 

Karthik as Vijay
Revathi as Manju
Nizhalgal Ravi as Ranjith
Janagaraj as an absent-minded man
Chinni Jayanth as Vijay's friend
Charle as a drunkard
Vennira Aadai Moorthy as Mandra Moorthy

Soundtrack 
The soundtrack was composed by Shankar–Ganesh, with lyrics written by Vairamuthu.

Reception 
P. S. S. of Kalki praised the cinematography and performances of the lead artistes but found the film's soundtrack dated.

References

External links 

1990 films
1990 romantic drama films
1990s Tamil-language films
Films directed by K. Rajeshwar
Films scored by Shankar–Ganesh
Indian romantic drama films